Velyki Mosty (IPA: [vəliki masti];) is a city in Chervonohrad Raion of  Lviv Oblast (region) of Western Ukraine. It hosts the administration of Velyki Mosty urban hromada, one of the hromadas of Ukraine.

In the Kingdom of Poland, the village of Mosty was a royal property, with its own starostas. The village itself was established in 1472, and was part of Belz Voivodeship. In the late 15th century, Mosty was ransacked and destroyed in a Crimean Tatars raid, and in July 1497, during the Moldavian expedition of John I Albert, a unit of Teutonic Knights under Johann von Tiefen, called upon by the Polish king, marched through the village. On 23 July 1549, during the period known as the Polish Golden Age, Mosty received Magdeburg rights. Following the order of King Zygmunt August, a nobleman Andrzej Rokicki became the first local wojt. Mosty enjoyed several royal privileges, issued in the years 1550, 1553, 1566, 1576, 1583, 1604. The town also became the seat of a starosta.

Until 1772, Mosty remained in Belz Voivodeship. Following the Partitions of Poland, the town became part of Austrian Galicia. In 1846, a complex of military barracks was built in Mosty. In the Second Polish Republic, the Central Police Academy was located here.

The Jewish population was important in the town before World War II. During World War II, as of June 29, 1941, Germans occupied the town and kept the Jews prisoners in a ghetto using them as forced labour before murdering them all. In early July, 1941, local residents burned 19 Jews in the Synagogue. Throughout the occupation, Ukrainian police assisted in most of the murders of their Jewish neighbors.  The town commander, Captain Johann Kroupa in the military-engineer division of the Wehrmacht, protected Jews from death during the first part of the occupation, employing more than 2000, including 1200 women, and helping forge work permits for some.  He was later court-martialed for protecting Jews and ended up in Soviet captivity.

Until 18 July 2020, Velyki Mosty belonged to Sokal Raion. The raion was abolished in July 2020 as part of the administrative reform of Ukraine, which reduced the number of raions of Lviv Oblast to seven. The area of Sokal Raion was merged into Chervonohrad Raion.

Currently, Mosty has a local branch of the Association of Polish Culture of the Lviv Land. Among people born here are photographer Wlodzimierz Puchalski, mathematician Wlodzimierz Stozek and Austrian painter Siegfried Weyr.

Population 
Currently, as of 2021, the population of the town is 6,312 people.

References

Cities in Lviv Oblast
Cities of district significance in Ukraine